is a railway station on the Minobu Line of Central Japan Railway Company (JR Central) located in the city of Fujinomiya, Shizuoka Prefecture, Japan.

Lines
Inako Station is served by the Minobu Line and is located 24.0 kilometers from the southern terminus of the line at Fuji Station.

Layout
Inako Station has one side platform serving a single bi-directional track. The track is located on a headshunt to permit passage of express trains. The station is unattended and has automated ticket machines and an automated turnstile.

Adjacent stations

History
Inako Station was opened on August 15, 1929 as part of the original Minobu Line for both passenger and freight services. It came under control of the Japanese Government Railways (JGR) on May 1, 1941. The JGR became the Japan National Railways (JNR) after World War II. Along with the division and privatization of JNR on April 1, 1987, the station came under the control and operation of the Central Japan Railway Company.

Passenger statistics
In fiscal 2017, the station was used by an average of 8 passengers daily (boarding passengers only).

Surrounding area
 Fuji River

See also
 List of railway stations in Japan

References

External links

Stations of the Minobu Line

Railway stations in Japan opened in 1929
Railway stations in Shizuoka Prefecture
Minobu Line
Fujinomiya, Shizuoka